Henry Morgenthau may refer to:
 Henry Morgenthau Sr. (1856–1946), United States diplomat
 Henry Morgenthau Jr. (1891–1967), United States Secretary of the Treasury
 Henry Morgenthau III (1917–2018), author and television producer of Screamers (2006)